Gary Rohan (born 7 June 1991) is an Australian rules footballer who plays for the Geelong Football Club in the Australian Football League (AFL), having been initially drafted to the Sydney Swans.

Junior career
Rohan participated in the Auskick program at Cobden. At 14 he could not get a game in the Cobden under-aged side so he gave up football in preference to mixed netball. The desire to play football again he tried out with the Geelong Falcons, struggling at first but his top-aged year saw great improvement. Rohan represented Victoria Country at the 2009 AFL National Under 18 Championships, winning the team's MVP award as well as All-Australian honours.

Geelong Falcons regional manager Michael Turner described Rohan as "the most exciting player I've ever seen".

Sydney coach Paul Roos admitted, "We were looking for players with pace, and Gary is very, very quick!"

AFL career

Rohan was drafted to Sydney with the sixth selection (just the Swans' second top-10 draft pick since the late 1990s) in the 2009 AFL Draft from the Geelong Falcons. Rohan made his AFL debut in round 7 of the 2010 season, against reigning premiers, Geelong, at Kardinia Park, where he had played much of his junior football with the Falcons. Rohan finished his debut season having played nine senior games for the Swans and kicking seven goals.

Much of Rohan's 2011 season was written off due to a serious hamstring injury but, when he returned to the senior side late in the year, he managed to have a profound impact on the side's performance. He was played as a near-permanent forward and performed well as he kicked goals and chased and tackled hard.

This injury ruled him out for the 2012 season.

After playing poorly in the 2014 AFL Grand Final, the following year also comprised injuries which  delayed his start to the 2016 AFL season. He played his first game in Round 9 against Hawthorn, in which he booted three goals. But his career was yet to really get going.

In 2017, Rohan missed the first four matches due to ongoing injury concerns. In just his second game for the year, against the Carlton Blues, he had a nasty fall and concussion and was out for two weeks. But his career took a good turn from there. Against the Richmond Football Club, he sealed the game with a right foot snap. But his biggest moment was in Round 14 against Essendon. With 24 seconds left, the Swans were five points down, and Rohan found himself in a one-on-one in the goalsquare. When his teammate Dane Rampe picked up the ball and banana-kicked it down his throat, Rohan stuck out his left hand and took the mark. He put it through after the siren to complete a 19-point comeback with  minutes to play. Against the Gold Coast Suns in Round 16, he had his best individual game, with 5 goals and 16 touches.

At the end of the 2018 season, Sydney Swans claimed that Rohan, like teammate Dan Hannebery, had requested a move home to Victoria. Rohan has since categorically stated that this was not the case and the claim that this decision was made for Rohan because his daughter, Willow, died earlier in the year from anencephaly is "hurtful".

In Round 14 of the 2021 AFL season, Rohan kicked the winning goal after the siren to defeat the Western Bulldogs, thus becoming only the second player after Barry Hall to do so for two different AFL clubs.

Personal life
Rohan and his ex-wife, Amie, had twin daughters, Bella and Willow, born on 12 April 2018. Willow died five hours after birth from anencephaly.

They welcomed their third daughter, Sadie Rose in March 2020.

Statistics
Updated to the end of the 2022 season.

|- 
| 2010 ||  || 16
| 9 || 7 || 1 || 64 || 33 || 97 || 28 || 23 || 0.8 || 0.1 || 7.1 || 3.7 || 10.8 || 3.1 || 2.6 || 0
|-
| 2011 ||  || 16
| 9 || 8 || 3 || 56 || 25 || 81 || 19 || 19 || 0.9 || 0.3 || 6.2 || 2.8 || 9.0 || 2.1 || 2.1 || 0
|- 
| 2012 ||  || 16
| 4 || 3 || 2 || 15 || 24 || 39 || 8 || 15 || 0.8 || 0.5 || 3.8 || 6.0 || 9.8 || 2.0 || 3.8 || 0
|-
| 2013 ||  || 16
| 5 || 5 || 1 || 18 || 7 || 25 || 12 || 11 || 1.0 || 0.2 || 3.6 || 1.4 || 5.0 || 2.4 || 2.2 || 0
|- 
| 2014 ||  || 16
| 16 || 6 || 9 || 103 || 69 || 172 || 42 || 37 || 0.4 || 0.6 || 6.4 || 4.3 || 10.8 || 2.6 || 2.3 || 0
|-
| 2015 ||  || 16
| 18 || 13 || 10 || 125 || 75 || 200 || 77 || 38 || 0.7 || 0.6 || 6.9 || 4.2 || 11.1 || 4.3 || 2.1 || 0
|- 
| 2016 ||  || 16
| 18 || 25 || 16 || 140 || 47 || 187 || 68 || 52 || 1.4 || 0.9 || 7.8 || 2.6 || 10.4 || 3.8 || 2.9 || 0
|-
| 2017 ||  || 16
| 16 || 22 || 10 || 116 || 37 || 153 || 64 || 52 || 1.4 || 0.6 || 7.3 || 2.3 || 9.5 || 4.0 || 3.2 || 3
|- 
| 2018 ||  || 16
| 11 || 7 || 4 || 71 || 22 || 93 || 27 || 30 || 0.6 || 0.4 || 6.5 || 2.0 || 8.5 || 2.4 || 2.7 || 0
|-
| 2019 ||  || 23
| 19 || 25 || 11 || 125 || 37 || 162 || 65 || 34 || 1.3 || 0.6 || 6.6 || 2.0 || 8.5 || 3.4 || 1.8 || 1
|- 
| 2020 ||  || 23
| 19 || 22 || 17 || 123 || 41 || 164 || 61 || 36 || 1.2 || 0.9 || 6.5 || 2.2 || 8.6 || 3.2 || 1.9 || 3
|-
| 2021 ||  || 23
| 21 || 32 || 18 || 147 || 67 || 214 || 75 || 41 || 1.5 || 0.9 || 7.0 || 3.2 || 10.2 || 3.6 || 2.0 || 1
|- 
| scope=row bgcolor=F0E68C | 2022# ||  || 23
| 12 || 14 || 6 || 71 || 37 || 108 || 31 || 29 || 1.2 || 0.5 || 5.9 || 3.1 || 9.0 || 2.6 || 2.4 || 0
|- class=sortbottom
! colspan=3 | Career
! 177 !! 189 !! 108 !! 1174 !! 521 !! 1695 !! 577 !! 417 !! 1.1 !! 0.6 !! 6.6 !! 2.9 !! 9.6 !! 3.3 !! 2.4 !! 8
|}

Notes

Honours and achievements
Team
 AFL premiership player: 2022
 2× McClelland Trophy: 2019, 2022
 2× McClelland Trophy: 2014, 2016

References

External links

Living people
1991 births
Sydney Swans players
Geelong Football Club players
Geelong Football Club Premiership players
Geelong Falcons players
Cobden Football Club players
Australian rules footballers from Geelong
One-time VFL/AFL Premiership players